Euphyes arpa, the palmetto skipper, is a butterfly of the family Hesperiidae.

Description 
The wingspan is 41–49 mm. The head and front of thorax are bright orange. The upperside of the forewings is reddish yellow with black borders in males and mostly black with a few reddish-yellow patches in females. The underside of the hindwings is bright yellow orange without markings in both males and females.

Ecology 
The larvae feed on the fronds of the palm species Serenoa repens, the saw palmetto, and live in silken tubes at the frond base. The species overwinters in the larval stage.

Adults feed on flower nectar from various plants, including the pickerelweeds (genus Pontederia). Adult males perch in sedge marshes to await females.

Habitat is generally moist with low palmetto scrub, including open pine flats, and forested scrub/shrub wetlands, with a necessary abundance of saw palmetto.

Range 
E. arpa is found in most of Florida, and immediately adjacent Georgia, Alabama, and Mississippi, possibly established resident only in Florida and Mississippi.

Brood 
Adults occur in most of Florida from about March to November, apparently with several broods per year.

Conservation status 
The species has not been assessed for the IUCN Red List. NatureServe ranks the species with a rounded global conservation status of G3: vulnerable. The species may be extirpated in the Florida Keys.

References

External links 
 Watercolor of larval, chrysalis and adult forms by John Abbott:
 

Butterflies described in 1834
Hesperiini